Francisco Torres Sánchez de Roa (1594 – 14 July 1651) was a Roman Catholic prelate who served as Bishop of Lugo (1650–1651).

Biography
Francisco Torres Sánchez de Roa was born in Becerril de Campos, Spain in 1594.
On 24 January 1650, he was appointed during the papacy of Pope Innocent X as Bishop of Lugo. In April 1650, he was consecrated bishop by Diego Arce Reinoso, Bishop of Tui. He served as Bishop of Lugo until his death on 14 July 1651.

References

External links and additional sources
 (for Chronology of Bishops) 
 (for Chronology of Bishops) 

17th-century Roman Catholic bishops in Spain
Bishops appointed by Pope Innocent X
1594 births
1651 deaths